Bellur  is a Village and a Grama Panchayat in Kasaragod district in the state of Kerala, India.

Demographics
As of 2011 Census, Bellur village had a population of 3,936 with 1,929 males and 2,007 females. In Bellur, 12.27% of the population was under 6 years of age. Bellur had an average literacy of 84.74% higher than the national average of 74% and lower than the state average of 94%: male literacy was 89.76% and female literacy was 79.93%.

Bellur Grama Panchayat had total population of 10,241 with 5,112 males and 5,129 females. Bellur Panchayat has administration over the villages of Bellur and Nettanige. 10.68% of the population in Bellur Panchayat was under 6 years of age.

Administration
Bellur Grama Panchayat is part of Kasaragod (State Assembly constituency) under Kasaragod Loksabha constituency.

References

Suburbs of Kasaragod
Villages in Kasaragod district